Petar Ičko (1755–1808) was an Ottoman and later Serbian diplomat, a merchant by profession from Ottoman Macedonia. He is remembered for instituting Ičko's Peace, though of short duration.

Biography
He was of Aromanian descent, born in the village of Katranitsa, at the time in the Ottoman Empire (today Pyrgoi, Greece), a place with developed merchant traditions. He resettled to the north, managing his own commercial business, and was employed as a dragoman in Ottoman diplomatic missions in Berlin and probably in Vienna. Settling in Ottoman Belgrade towards the end of the 18th century, he became an affluent merchant. He closely collaborated with the Vizier of the Pashaluk of Belgrade, Hadži Mustafa Pasha, and according to some sources both of them were members of one Masonic Lodge. After the return to power of the renegade Janissaries (Dahije), he was forced in 1802 to move to Zemun, at that time a Habsburg Military Frontier town.  After the outbreak of the First Serbian Uprising (1804), he began supporting and working with the Serbian rebels led by Karađorđe. He rendered them some valuable advice thanks to his diplomatic and trade skills. The rebel leaders sent him as their representative in Constantinople where he managed to obtain for them a favourable peace treaty, known as "Ičko's Peace". He returned and lived in Belgrade as an honorary citizen, but died there soon after, on 5 May 1808, probably poisoned.

His son Naum Ičko established the "Question-mark" bistro in 1823. His house is preserved today as "Ičko's House"

Annotations
He was surnamed Itskoglou, rendered in Serbian as Ičkoglija (Ичкоглија) and Ičkoglić (Ичкоглић).

See also
 List of Serbian Revolutionaries

References

Sources
  
  
  
 
 
 Stanford Jay Shaw. Between Old and New: the Ottoman Empire under Sultan Selim III, 1789-1807. Cambridge, Massachusetts, Harvard University Press, 1971, pp. 342–356.
 Paul Frederic Shupp. The European Powers and the Near Eastern Question, 1806-1807, Columbia university press, 1931, pp. 179–180.
 Anatoliĭ Filippovich Miller. Mustapha Pacha Baĭraktar. Association internationale d'études du Sud-Est européen, 1975, p. 404.
 Traian Stoianovich. "The Conquering Balkan Orthodox Merchant", Journal of Economic History, XX (June, 1960), pp. 234–313.
 

1775 births
1808 deaths
Dragomans
Serbian diplomats
Serbian people of Aromanian descent
People of the Serbian Revolution
Aromanian revolutionaries
People from Kozani (regional unit)
18th-century translators